Kɔrɔmba, or Basa-Gurmana, is a Kainji language of Nigeria.

References

Basa languages
Languages of Nigeria